Stigmatochromis woodi is a species of cichlid endemic to Lake Malawi where it can be found hunting for prey over sandy areas.  It can reach a length of  TL.  It can also be found in the aquarium trade. The specific name honours Rodney C. Wood, whose collection of cichlids from Lake Malawi, which included the type of this species, was presented to the British Museum (Natural History). It is the type species of the genus Stigmatochromis.

References

woodi
Taxa named by Charles Tate Regan
Taxonomy articles created by Polbot
Fish described  in 1922